Icelander is the debut novel of Dustin Long. It is part of the Rectangulars line of McSweeney's Books. It appeared on the Los Angeles Times best-seller's list.

Plot
The plot primarily follows the adventures of a character known only as Our Heroine as she attempts to solve the mystery of her friend's murder while repeated flashbacks detail her family's past adventures in the underground Icelandic kingdom of Vanaheim.

Style
Though playing on the mystery genre, the book is more in line with the postmodern fiction of Vladimir Nabokov, Thomas Pynchon, Alasdair Gray, and Flann O'Brien.

The author created a real life "Bean Day" website, in reference to the event in the novel.

References

2006 novels
McSweeney's books
Novels set in Iceland
2006 debut novels